Sven Rosén may refer to:
Sven Rosén (gymnast) (1887–1963), Swedish gymnast
Sven Rosén (Pietist) (1708–1750), Radical-Pietistic writer and leader
 Sven Rosén (footballer), Swedish former footballer